The Canadian Improv Games (CIG) is an education based format of improvisational theatre for Canadian high schools.   To participate in the games, high school students form teams of up to  8 players and are required to pay a registration fee (if their school is not able to cover the cost). The teams compete in regional tournaments, organized and coordinated by regional Canadian Improv Games volunteers. Players perform improvised scenes, fuelled by suggestions provided by the audience. Each scene is judged based on a fixed rubric. The winning team from each region proceeds to the National Festival and Tournament held in Ottawa.  The National Arts Centre is a major sponsor of the Canadian Improv Games. The National Arts Centre is the site of the National Festival and Ottawa Tournament.  The Games were created by Jamie "Willie" Wyllie and Howard Jerome, based on a concept originally conceived by David Shepherd and Howard Jerome.  David Shepherd was the producer of North America's first professional improvisational theater The Compass Players in Chicago, which, was the forerunner of the Second City.

Format
There are three official formats of the Canadian Improv Games: National tournament, Junior tournament, & Online Wildcard.

The National Tournament
The National Tournament has run for over forty years and was developed with the input of hundreds of teachers and professional improvisers. The five events of the CIG challenge improvisers and their team to show a wide range of skills within a short period of time. The format also allows for the improvisers to demonstrate and develop social and life skills such as listening, cooperation, teamwork, and being able to work under pressure. The top 18 teams from the Regions across Canada travel to Ottawa to compete one night, with the top 5 moving forward to the National Finals.

The Online Wildcard Tournament 
The Online Wildcard is open to registered Canadian Improv Games student teams and offers an additional opportunity to receive feedback on their performances from CIG judges and trainers while also getting an extra chance to qualify for the National Tournament in Ottawa. Teams submit a video of their events taped in front of a live audience. Once submitted these are then sent to the Online Wildcard Judges and Adjudicators who will then send crucial feedback that will help the growth of the team and to select a winner.

The Junior Tournament
The Junior Tournament is similar to the National Tournament with a few exceptions. Its focus is on younger students, grades 7–10, and was created to help build strong leadership skills within younger students. This format also focuses younger improvisers on the basic scene structure with the addition of the Open Event. This additional format also allows for more stage time for younger players to gain confidence and performance experience in front of an audience.

The teams consist of no more than eight performing members. Teams are given the option of maintaining 2 alternate players; it is recommended that teams have no less than five players.

There are 5 events in the Canadian Improv Games, including: Life, Character, Style, Story and Theme (and open as opposed to life in junior tournaments).  Teams must perform 4 of these 5 events, including mandatory Theme and Life scenes. During a night of play, the players will provide the audience with an ask-for. An ask-for is used to specify the type of suggestion the team requires to fuel their scene.   An ask-for can be a variety of things, ranging from, the title of a song, a non-geographical location, or simply an adjective. Scenes may last up to 4 minutes, and a whistle will be blown when the allotted time is up. The team is not penalized for the having the whistle blown, it simply means the end of the scene. However, they are not required to use the entire 4 minutes. Before performing a scene, the players may 'huddle' for up to 15 seconds to prepare and briefly discuss the upcoming scene. This also allows the opportunity for players to discuss the suggestion. Time calls from linespersons change and vary depending on location but one minute and thirty second time calls have been implemented in the 2008 season.

Judges are Canadian Improv Games volunteers, often accredited with theatre and improv experience. They are responsible for watching and scoring each scene in a given round. Each judge has a maximum of fifty-nine points available to award to each scene. Although there is no question that improvisation is an artistic and creative endeavour, judges also take into consideration an array of specific technical skills. These skills are making and accepting offers, advancing, listening, commitment, stakes, and staging. Judges can also awards points for skill of the event, use of suggestion, interest, and risk. Most scenes incorporate the "five elements" which include, location, relationship and characters, conflict, raising of the stakes, and a resolution. Scenes are judged out of a maximum total of 59 points.

2021 Season, An Online Experiment?
In the 2021 season due to the outbreak of COVID-19 and it not being safe to continue on with the tournament in person the games were continued with a fully online tournament. In which there was three categories and three winners. A category for all junior teams, a category for senior teams who can meet safely in person, and a category for senior teams who can not meet safely online and have to do their scenes and work online, over zoom or google meet mainly.

Night of Play
Each team will perform on at least one night of play in their regional tournament throughout the duration of the school year. The regional tournament is the competitive culmination of a season’s worth of training, practicing, rehearsing and performing. Many regions hold exhibition nights of play in addition to the competitive tournament. 

At regional and nationals a typical night of play goes like this:
• Teams arrive early to warm up and provide the head referee with the events they will play
that evening.
• As show time approaches, the team lines up backstage.
• Referees introduce themselves on stage, then the teams.
• Head referee leads everyone in recitation of the Canadian Improv Games Oath.
• Head referee announces which team will play and what event will be played. The order in
which teams appear in each round is randomized ahead of time.
• Teams solicit suggestions from the audience with the aid of the referees.
• Once the chosen suggestion(s) are announced, the team has 15 seconds to huddle, and
then the play begins.
• Each scene has a four minute time limit, although teams can end the scene at any time
during that time period.
• Once the scene is done the team sits, and the referee calls out the next team and event.
Repeat.
• The judging panel is often introduced between rounds along with other relevant
announcements and an intermission.
• After all play has completed, judges go backstage to tally their scores, and referees/
volunteers spend time with the audience (read: stalling). This is a great time to do What’s In
The Box or other announcements.
• A referee or judge reads out the scores.

CIG season overview
Each Regional tournament will offer a number of workshop and performance opportunities to teams throughout the year. The Season typically runs September to February, with registration starting in September, Workshops October & November and Exhibition rounds December & January. Regional Tournaments, depending on the region will happen in January or February with the National Tournament taking place in April.  

Depending on how large a region is both geographically and team-wise there may be an introduction to Zones, winners of Zones move on to the Regional Tournaments semi-finals and finals round.

Regions

Vancouver (Lower Mainland)
Vancouver Island
Alberta
Regina
Winnipeg
Sudbury
Greater Toronto
Kingston
TriCity Area 
Ottawa
Montreal
Moncton
Halifax
St John's
(Online tournament)

Events
If a team is provided a suggestion that they do not understand they are allowed to request a definition, which is supplied by either a judge or referee. If a team has used the given suggestion previously, they are to do a different scene from the one they’ve done with the same suggestion.

Life

In the Life event the team must present an improvised scene "honestly and sincerely." This may include "moments" in people's lives or merely a realistic representation of an unrealistic situation. Events in a life scene must be dealt with truthfully. The premise of a scene can range from a first date or family trauma to the car not starting.  The life event is not intended for broad laughter. Entertainment and humorous moments are generated from the reality of a situation or sincerity of an interaction. A common ask for in this event is "a crisis in a teenager's life." Dated versions of the Life Event stipulated "a pivotal moment in a teenager's life," as an obligatory ask-for. This is the best event.

Story

In the Story event, a team must perform "an original story in an improvised setting, including an aspect of narration." Forms of narration vary. Each improvised story must contain a beginning, middle, and end, not necessarily in that order. This is another event where the team will ask the audience for a suggestion or inspiration before they begin.  It is of utmost importance that these three sections are obvious to the audience, because it is those elements that define the scene as a story.

Character

The Character event does not have to be a scene but it usually ends up being one, as the main purpose for this event is to show how well the team can develop and use a character that they create usually based on audience suggestion.  It is usually best when a character trait is blown out of proportion or if the character is placed in a situation that would make them stand out.  Anyone on the team can use a trait given by the audience, sometimes creating two characters on the same trait, or one on the original trait, and another on its antithesis.   The team will usually ask for a character trait to use in their about-to-be-developed character(s) before they begin and some teams will even ask for other suggestions as well that they can use for inspiration, although teams may also ask for something like a location from which to derive their characteristic(s)- i.e. a haunted house would be 'creepy'. 
Players should be careful, however that the Character Event does not become the "Character Trait" event. The purpose of this event is not to show forty-seven ways to be greedy. The purpose is to create a character; a character trait is only a small (but still prominent) part of that character. The improviser should have an idea of what that character is like in all facets; not just a trait, but for example, what kind of friends that character has, what activities the character might enjoy, even a small sampling of some past experiences that character might have had. The character must be fully formed and plausible. (Can be wacky, and over the top, but they cannot be downright impossible to believe). A good Character scene is when other members are continuously endowing the character and giving him/her chances to show off the character trait.

Theme

In the Theme event, the teams are "given a theme which they must explore in one or more scenes." Theme is quite unique and different from the other games as unlike the other events where the inspiration and suggestion comes from the audience, theme suggestions can come in various ways and is usually given to the team by the host.  However, if the team wishes, they are allowed to ask for another suggestion from the audience. For example, this could be a location in which to explore the theme in.  Suggestions could be fortune cookie sayings, haiku or just a single word.  Once given their theme suggestion teams must explore that theme in as many ways as possible. This may be done as one scene or as a series of vignettes (the overwhelmingly most popular approach, also known as the Harold style).  The connection to the theme may be literal or figurative.

Style

Style showcases the team's ability to portray a certain genre of media, usually from film, theater or television.  Mime, cheesy horror film, slam poetry, Musical theater, Shakespearean play, and infomercial are examples of different styles that have been seen in performances.  Teams may put a lot of research into the style. They are not meant to parody a genre but actually produce an example of that genre. A team performing a style event must tell the audience attributes of their specific style before play for sake of scoring. For example; in the style of "mime", players will not speak and all objects will be pantomimed.

Open

A handle (suggestion) is taken from the audience, as chosen by a referee. Suggestions may include occupations, relationships, non-geographical locations or objects. This event consists of one scene, from beginning to end, without narration. It is very similar to Story. This style is not performed during Nationals however it is often seen at practice competitions such as Moncton's November tournament. Open is a popular event for junior competitions.

Tradition

Oath

Before every show begins, everyone must rise and place their right hand over their heart, and their left hand on a "G-rated body part" of someone next to them.  A referee will begin reciting the Oath as the audience and players repeat it:

We have come together 
In the spirit of loving competition,
To celebrate the Canadian Improv Games.
We promise to uphold the ideals of improvisation, 
To co-operate with one another, 
To learn from each other, 
To commit ourselves to the moment,
And above all…
To Have A Good Time!

Warm-up

Teams generally meet up about an hour before the show to warm-up altogether with the referees.  The overall purpose of the games is to be a "loving competition", so a joint warm-up helps with this feeling of camaraderie, the referees tend to spread out the teams into groups of members of other teams as to build a friendly bond for the competition.

"What's. In. The box?"
French: C'est quoi dans la boite? Je ne sais pas!; Russian: Что в коробке?

"What's in the box" is a popular Improv fundraiser in which the hosts gather a variety of prizes, put them in a box, and sell off raffle tickets for various prices. Halfway through the show the officials will give a hint distantly related to the contents of the box when time comes the official will explain the clue usually in a run on sentence. As prizes are given out the teams are encouraged to say there are more as the official prompts by saying "But wait..." prior to pulling out another object. The many mystery prizes within the box will be revealed and usually tied to a theme by the presenters as drawn out of the box. These prizes are often "silly" prizes such as odd books and bars of soap as well as Canadian Improv Games merchandise. Often a "real" prize will also be offered for selection (such as chocolates, CDs and gift cards), in which case two raffle winners are selected and often have to participate in a small competition to see who gets to choose their prize first.

Nerds Exposed To Others

1995 YTV Broadcast
For the 1995 season YTV (TV channel) did a broadcast showing all of the teams that made the finals.

CBC Gem Documentary Series
For the 2019 season Andrew Phung of Kim's Convenience fame, along with CBC Television made a mini documentary series on the canadian improv games national festival interviewing the five teams who made the finals, and the sixth place team who barely missed.

At the 2021 Canadian Screen Awards Andrew Phung won the award for best host, web program or series for his work on the CBC series.

References

External links
Canadian Improv Games 

Improvisational theatre in Canada
Education in Canada